The anime television series The Laughing Salesman is based in on the Japanese manga series of the same name created by Fujiko A. Fujio.  The first animated series was produced by Shin-Ei Animation and commenced screening on TBS as part of the Gimme a Break variety show on 17 October 1989 and extended for three seasons with a total of 117 episodes which included 9 specials and 1 prologue pilot. The series consists of stories adapted from the manga as well as brand new original stories created for the anime.

The series began with a short 4 minute prologue and each episode is 10 minutes in length. A number of specials were also released, often double-length and containing two separate self-contained stories. The names of the characters in the summaries are written in the Japanese order to obtain the alternate meaning or reference when both names are read aloud.

Season 1
The first animated series was produced by Shin-Ei Animation and commenced screening on TBS as part of the Gimme a Break variety show on 17 October 1989. The series was directed by Toshirō Kuni with scripts by Yasuo Tanami and music by Kōhei Tanaka.

Season 2

Season 3

Special Programming 
These episodes aired together on three specific days as 2 hour specials.

New Laughing Salesman

References

Laughing Salesman, The